Sint Eustatius, also known locally as Statia, is an island in the Caribbean. It is a special municipality (officially "public body") of the Netherlands.

The island lies in the northern Leeward Islands portion of the West Indies, southeast of the Virgin Islands. Sint Eustatius is immediately to the northwest of Saint Kitts, and to the southeast of Saba. The regional capital is Oranjestad. Travellers to the island by air arrive through F. D. Roosevelt Airport. Formerly part of the Netherlands Antilles, Sint Eustatius became a public body of the Netherlands on 10 October 2010. Together with Bonaire and Saba it forms the Caribbean Netherlands (not to be confused with Dutch Caribbean which also includes Curaçao, Aruba, and Sint Maarten).

The name of the island, "Sint Eustatius", is the Dutch name for Saint Eustace (also spelled Eustachius or Eustathius), a legendary Christian martyr, known in Spanish as San Eustaquio and in Portuguese as Santo Eustáquio or Santo Eustácio. The indigenous name for the island is Aloi meaning cashew tree (origin Arawak).

History

The earliest inhabitants were Caribs believed to have come from the Amazon basin (South America) and migrated north from Venezuela via the Lesser Antilles. In the early 20th century, settlement traces were discovered at Golden Rock and Orange Bay.

Multiple pre-Columbian sites have been found on the island, most notably the site referred to as the "Golden Rock Site". It is thought that the island was likely seen by Christopher Columbus in 1493. From the first European settlement, in the 17th century until the early 19th century, St. Eustatius changed hands twenty-one times between the Netherlands, Britain, and France.

In 1636, the chamber of Zeeland of the Dutch West India Company took possession of the island, reported to be uninhabited at the time. In 1678 the islands of St. Eustatius, Sint Maarten and Saba were under the direct command of the Dutch West India Company, with a commander stationed on St. Eustatius to govern all three. At the time, the island was of some importance for the cultivation of tobacco and sugar. More important was the role of St. Eustatius in the trans-Atlantic slave trade and the intercolonial slave trade.

Slave trade and free port

Sint Eustatius became the most profitable asset of the Dutch West India Company and a transit point for enslaved Africans in the transatlantic slave trade. The ruins of the Waterfort on the southwest coast of the island are reminders of this past. A slave house of two floors was located in the Waterfort. Plantations of sugar cane, tobacco and indigo were established on the island and worked with labor of enslaved Africans. In 1774 there were 75 plantations on the island with names such as Gilboa, Kuilzak, Zelandia, Zorg en Rust, Nooit Gedacht, Ruym Sigt and Golden Rock.

In the 18th century, St. Eustatius's geographical placement in the middle of Danish (Virgin Islands), British (Jamaica, St. Kitts, Barbados, Antigua), French (St. Domingue, Ste. Lucie, Martinique, Guadeloupe) and Spanish (Cuba, Santo Domingo, Puerto Rico) territories—its large harborage, neutrality and status from 1756 as a free port with no customs duties were all factors in it becoming a major point of transhipment of captured Africans, goods, and a locus for trade in contraband. Transshipment of captured Africans to the British, French, and Spanish islands of the eastern Caribbean was significant enough that the colonists constructed a building inside the fortress Amsterdam. This building served as a depot of enslaved Africans for the Dutch West India Company until around 1740. It housed about 450 people. St. Eustatius's economy flourished under the Dutch by ignoring the monopolistic trade restrictions of the British, French and Spanish islands; it became known as The Golden Rock.
Edmund Burke said of the island in 1781:
It has no produce, no fortifications for its defence, nor martial spirit nor military regulations ... Its utility was its defence. The universality of its use, the neutrality of its nature was its security and its safeguard. Its proprietors had, in the spirit of commerce, made it an emporium for all the world. ... Its wealth was prodigious, arising from its industry and the nature of its commerce.

"First Salute"

The island sold arms and ammunition to anyone willing to pay, and it was therefore one of the few places from which the young United States could obtain military stores. The good relationship between St. Eustatius and the United States resulted in the noted "First Salute".

On 16 November 1776, the 14-gun American brig Andrew Doria commanded by Captain Isaiah Robinson sailed, flying the Continental Colors of the fledgling United States, into the anchorage below St. Eustatius' Fort Oranje. Robinson announced his arrival by firing a thirteen gun salute, one gun for each of the thirteen American colonies in rebellion against Britain. Governor Johannes de Graaff replied with an eleven-gun salute from the cannons of Fort Oranje (international protocol required two guns fewer to acknowledge a sovereign flag). It was the first international acknowledgment of American independence. The Andrew Doria had arrived to purchase munitions for the American Revolutionary forces. She was carrying a copy of the Declaration of Independence which was presented to Governor De Graaff. An earlier copy had been captured by the British on its way to Holland. It was wrapped in documents that the British believed to be a strange cipher, but were actually written in Yiddish, addressed to Jewish merchants in Holland.

President Franklin D. Roosevelt visited St. Eustatius for two hours on 27 February 1939 on USS Houston to recognise the importance of the 1776 "First Salute". He presented a large brass plaque to St. Eustatius, displayed today under a flagpole atop the walls of Fort Oranje, reading:

"In commemoration to the salute to the flag of the United States, Fired in this fort November 16. 1776, By order of Johannes de Graaff, Governor of Saint Eustatius, In reply to a National Gun-Salute, Fired by the United States Brig of War Andrew Doria, Under Captain Isaiah Robinson of the Continental Navy, Here the sovereignty of the United States of America was first formally acknowledged to a national vessel by a foreign official. Presented by Franklin Delano Roosevelt, President of the United States of America"

The recognition provided the title for Barbara W. Tuchman's 1988 book The First Salute: A View of the American Revolution.

Capture by British Admiral Rodney 1791

The British took the Andrew Doria incident seriously, and protested bitterly against the continuous trade between the United Colonies and St. Eustatius. In 1778, Lord Stormont claimed in Parliament that, "if Sint Eustatius had sunk into the sea three years before, the United Kingdom would already have dealt with George Washington". Nearly half of all American Revolutionary military supplies were obtained through St. Eustatius. Nearly all American communications to Europe first passed through the island. The trade between St. Eustatius and the United States was the main reason for the Fourth Anglo-Dutch War of 1780–1784. Notably, the British Admiral George Brydges Rodney, having occupied the island for Great Britain in 1781, urged the commander of the landing troops, Major-General Sir John Vaughan, to seize "Mr. Smith at the house of Jones – they (the Jews of St. Eustatius, Caribbean Antilles) cannot be too soon taken care of – they are notorious in the cause of America and France." The war was disastrous for the Dutch economy.

Britain declared war on the Republic of the Seven United Netherlands on 20 December 1780. Even before officially declaring war, Britain had outfitted a massive battle fleet to take and destroy the weapons depot and vital commercial centre that St. Eustatius had become. British Admiral George Brydges Rodney was appointed the commander of the battle fleet. 3 February 1781, the massive fleet of 15 ships of the line and numerous smaller ships transporting over 3,000 soldiers appeared before St. Eustatius prepared to invade. Governor De Graaff did not know about the declaration of war. Rodney offered De Graaff a bloodless surrender to his superior force.  Rodney had over 1,000 cannon to De Graaff's one dozen cannon and a garrison of sixty men. De Graaff surrendered the island, but first fired two rounds as a show of resistance in honour of Dutch Admiral Lodewijk van Bylandt, who commanded a ship of the Dutch Navy which was in the harbor. Ten months later, the island was conquered by the French, allies of the Dutch Republic in the war. The Dutch regained control over the looted and plundered island in 1784.

A series of disastrous French and British occupations of Sint Eustatius from 1795 to 1815 diverted trade to the occupiers' islands. St. Eustatius' economy collapsed, and the merchants, including the Jews left. St. Eustatius reverted permanently to Dutch control from 1816.

At its peak, St. Eustatius may have had a largely transient population of about 10,000 people. Most were engaged in commercial and maritime interests.  A census list of 1790 gives a total population (free and enslaved people combined) of 8,124. Commerce revived after the British left. Many of the merchants (including the Jews) returned to the island. However, French and British occupations from 1795 disrupted trade and also the North-Americans, now globally recognised as an independent nation, had meanwhile developed their own trading network and did not need St. Eustatius anymore. The island was eclipsed by other Dutch ports, such as those on the islands of Curaçao and Sint Maarten. During the last years of the 18th century Statia developed trade in bay rum. The economy declined in the early 19th century. From about 1795 the population declined, dropping to 921 in 1948.

Jewish population
The first record of Jews on St. Eustatius dates to 1660. The Jews were mainly merchants with significant international trading and maritime commercial ties. Jews were captains, owners or co-owners with Christian partners, of significant numbers of ships originating out of St. Eustatius. A few were island plantation owners. Jews were estimated to have composed at least 10% of the permanent population of St. Eustatius.

Ten days after the island surrendered to the British on 3 February 1781, Rodney ordered that the entire Jewish male adult population assemble for him. They were rounded up and thirty one heads of families were summarily deported to St. Kitts without word or mercy to their dependents. The choice of exiling the Jews to St. Kitts was significant. The nearby British Island of Nevis had a large Jewish population and an established community capable of aiding the refugees.  St. Kitts did not have any Jewish community or population. The other seventy-one were locked up in the weighing house in Lower Town where they were held for three days.

Expulsion of Americans followed on 23 February, of merchants from Amsterdam on 24 February and of other Dutch citizens and Frenchmen on 5 March. The crews of the Dutch ships Rodney took were sent to St. Kitts for imprisonment – after first stripping them of all their belongings. Because of their maltreatment, many perished. The Jews were well received on St. Kitts – where many knew them as their respected business partners. They were supported in their protest against their deportation and it proved successful. They were allowed to return to St. Eustatius after a few weeks to observe all their property being sold at small fractions of the original value after having been confiscated by Rodney.

The resentment the British felt for the population of this island that helped the Americans to defeat them translated in a harsh treatment of the inhabitants. There were numerous complaints about "individuals of both sexes being halted in the streets and being body searched in a most scandalous way." Pieter Runnels, an eighty-year-old member of the island council and captain of the civic guard, did not survive the rough treatment he received aboard Rodney's ship. He, a member of one of the island's oldest-established families, became the only civilian casualty of the British occupation. British soldiers prevented the family and others paying their last respects at his funeral from using the water from the family's own cistern.

The tomb of former governor Jan de Windt was broken open by British soldiers, all the silver decorations stolen off the caskets, and the bodies of the governor and his wife exposed, without any of Rodney's officers interfering.

Rodney singled out the Jews: the harshness was reserved for them alone. He did not do the same to French, Dutch, Spanish or even the American merchants on the island. He permitted the French to leave with all their possessions. Rodney was concerned that his unprecedented behavior would be repeated upon British islands by French forces when events were different. However, Governor De Graaff was also deported.

As he did with all other warehouses, Rodney confiscated the Jewish warehouses, looted Jewish personal possessions, even cutting the lining of their clothes to find money hidden in there. When Rodney realized that the Jews might be hiding additional treasure, he dug up the Jewish cemetery.

Later, in February 1782, Edmund Burke, the leading opposition member of the Whig Party, upon learning of Rodney's actions in St. Eustatius, rose to condemn Rodney's anti-Semitic, avaricious vindictiveness in Parliament:

"...and a sentence of general beggary pronounced in one moment upon a whole people. A cruelty unheard of in Europe for many years… The persecution was begun with the people whom of all others it ought to be the care and the wish of human nations to protect, the Jews… the links of communication, the mercantile chain… the conductors by which credit was transmitted through the world…a resolution taken (by the British conquerors) to banish this unhappy people from the island. They suffered in common with the rest of the inhabitants, the loss of their merchandise, their bills, their houses, and their provisions; and after this they were ordered to quit the island, and only one day was given them for preparation; they petitioned, they remonstrated against so hard a sentence, but in vain; it was irrevocable."

The synagogue and the cemetery

From about 1815, when there was no longer a viable Jewish community using and maintaining the synagogue on St. Eustatius, it gradually fell into ruin.

The synagogue building, known as Honen Dalim, (He who is charitable to the Poor) was constructed in 1737. Permission for building the synagogue came from the Dutch West India Company, additional funding came from the Jewish community on Curaçao. Permission was conditional on the fact that the Jewish house of worship would be sited where "the exercise of their (Jewish) religious duties would not molest those of the Gentiles". The building is located off a small lane called Synagogue Path, away from the main street. The synagogue attested to the wealth of the Jews of St. Eustatius and their influence on the island.

In 2001, its walls were restored as part of the Historic Core Restoration Project, although there are no known images showing what the synagogue looked like when still in use, so that archeological research is attempting to restore the structure to the best estimate of its former condition. The grounds include a Jewish ritual bath (mikveh) and an oven used on Passover.

A restored and respectfully maintained Jewish cemetery is located adjacent to the Old Church Cemetery, at the top of Oranjestad, Sint Eustatius.

Slave Revolt of 1848
After 1848, slavery only existed on the Dutch and Danish Eastern Caribbean islands, which caused unrest on the islands colonized by the Netherlands. As a result, a proclamation declared on 6 June 1848 on Sint Maarten that enslaved Africans would be treated as free persons.

Unrest also arose on Sint Eustatius. On 12 June 1848, a group of free and enslaved Africans gathered in front of Lieutenant Governor Johannes de Veer's home demanding their declaration of liberty, increased rations, and more free hours. The Island Governor addressed the group, but it persisted in its demands. The militia was mobilized and, after consultation with the Colonial Council and the main residents, an attack was decided by the Lieutenant Governor. After another warning to leave the city or otherwise experience the consequences, fire was opened on the group. The insurgents fled the city, leaving two or three seriously injured. From a hill just outside the city they pelted the militia with stones and pieces of rock. A group of 35 shooters stormed the hill, killing two insurgents and injuring several. The six leaders of the uprising were exiled from the island and transferred to Curaçao. Thomas Dupersoy, a free African, is considered the chief leader of the uprising. One of the other leaders sent a death notice to his "owner" in 1851. After the uprising, the largest plantation owners on Sint Eustatius decided to give their enslaved workers a certain wage for fear of repetition of revolt.

Abolition of slavery
In 1863 slavery was officially abolished in the Netherlands. The Dutch were among the last to abolish slavery. The freed slaves no longer wanted to live in the field and moved to the city. Due to a lack of trade, the bay of Sint Eustatius underwent a recession. Natural disasters such as the hurricane of September 1928 and May 1929 accelerated the process of economic decline on the island.

Dissolution of the Netherlands Antilles

Sint Eustatius became a member of the Netherlands Antilles when that grouping was created in 1954. Between 2000 and 2005 the member islands of the Netherlands Antilles voted on their future status. In a referendum on 8 April 2005, 77% of Sint Eustatius voters voted to remain within the Netherlands Antilles, compared to 21% who voted for closer ties with the Netherlands. None of the other islands voted to remain.

After the other islands decided to leave, ending the Netherlands Antilles, the island council opted to become a special municipality of the Netherlands, like Saba and Bonaire. This process was completed in October 2010. In 2011 the island officially adopted the US dollar as its currency.

Geography

Sint Eustatius is 6 miles (10 km) long and up to 3 miles (5 km) wide. Topographically, the island is saddle-shaped, with the 602-meter-high dormant volcano Quill (Mount Mazinga), (from Dutch kuil, meaning 'pit'—originally referring to its crater) to the southeast and the smaller summits of Signal Hill/Little Mountain (or Bergje) and Boven Mountain to the northwest. The Quill crater is a popular tourist attraction on the island. The bulk of the island's population lives in the flat saddle between the two elevated areas, which forms the centre of the island.

Climate
St. Eustatius has a tropical monsoon climate. Tropical storms and hurricanes are common. The Atlantic hurricane season runs from 1 June to 30 November, sharply peaking from late August through September. Tropical Cyclone Climatology

Nature
As St. Eustatius is a volcanic island and very small, all of the beaches on the island are made up of black volcanic sand. These volcanic sands, especially one of the more popular nesting beaches called Zeelandia, are very important nesting sites for several endangered sea turtles such as: the green turtle, leatherback, loggerhead and hawksbill.
Sint Eustatius is home to one of the last remaining populations of the critically endangered Lesser Antillean iguana (Iguana delicatissima). The population was strongly affected during the high-intensity hurricane year of 2017, with especially Hurricane Maria, during which the population declined by 25%.

National parks
Sint Eustatius has three nature parks – on land and at sea: the Sint Eustatius National Marine Park, Quill/Boven National Park, and Miriam Schmidt Botanical Garden. Two of them have national park status. These areas have been designated as important bird areas. The nature parks are maintained by the St Eustatius National Parks Foundation (STENAPA).

Archaeology
Due to its turbulent history, Sint Eustatius is rich in archaeological sites. Nearly 300 sites have been documented. The island is said to have the highest concentration of archaeological sites of any area of comparable size. In the 1920s, J.P.B. Josselin de Jong conducted archaeological research into Saladoid sites on the island and in the 1980s a great deal of research was done by archaeologist Aad Versteeg of Leiden University. Around 1981, under the direction of archaeologist Norman F. Barka, the College of William & Mary in Williamsburg, Virginia also started archaeological research on Sint Eustatius. The documented archaeological sites include prehistoric sites, plantations, military sites, commercial trading sites (including shipwrecks), and urban sites (churches, government buildings, cemeteries, residences). The St. Eustatius Center for Archaeological Research (SECAR) has been conducting archaeological research on the island since 2004 including excavations at the Godet African Burial Ground and the Golden Rock African Burial Ground.

In June 2021, SECAR became involved in protests against excavations at the 18th-century burial ground Golden Rock on the island. The Ubuntu Connected Front and other concerned citizens of Sint Eustatius denounced the non-involvement of the community in the excavation process through a petition and letters to the government. The majority of the population on St. Eustatius are of African descent. Participation in cultural heritage, i.e. involving the community whose ancestors are being excavated, is good practice in contemporary archaeology. Archaeological excavations on St. Eustatius apparently fall under the old Monuments Act for the BES islands that is very brief on these issues. The 2016 Dutch Heritage Act offers more protection for cultural heritage. The Committee on Kingdom Relations asked Secretary of State Raymond Knops questions about the matter. A Statia Heritage and Research Commission (SHRC) set up by the government of St. Eustatius is investigating the allegations of the protest groups and should come up with recommendations.

Demography

Population
As of January 2019, the population was 3,138, with a population density of 150 inhabitants per square kilometre.

Language
The official language is Dutch, but English is the "language of everyday life" on the island and education is solely in English. A local English-based creole is also spoken informally. More than 52% of the population speak more than one language. The most widely spoken languages are English (92.7%), Dutch (36%), Spanish (33.8%) and Papiamento (20.8%).

Religion
Sint Eustatius is predominantly a Christian territory. The main denominations are Methodist 28.6%, Catholics 23.7%, Adventist 17.8%, Pentecostal 7.2% and Anglicans 2.6%.

Economy

In the 18th century, "Statia" was the most important Dutch island in the Caribbean and was a center of great wealth from trading. At this time it was known as the "Golden Rock" because of its immense wealth. A very large number of warehouses lined the road that runs along Oranje Bay; most (but not all) of these warehouses are now ruined and some of the ruins are partially underwater.

A French occupation in 1795 was the beginning of the end of great prosperity for Sint Eustatius.

According to the Sint Eustatius government website, "Statia's economy is stable and well placed to grow in the near future. With practically no unemployment and a skilled workforce, we have a infrastructure in place to ensure sustained growth." The government itself is the largest employer on the island, and the oil terminal owned by NuStar Energy is the largest private employer on the island.

Energy and water 

Statia Utility Company N.V. provides electricity to the island, as well as drinking water per truck and on part of the island by a water network. The electricity supply is rapidly being made green. Until 2016 all electricity was produced by diesel generators. In March 2016 the first phase of the solar park with 1.89 MWp capacity became operational, covering 23% of entire electricity demand. In November 2017 another 2.15 MWp was added, totaling 14,345 solar panels, with 4.1 MW capacity and a yearly production of 6.4 GWh. The solar park includes lithium ion batteries of 5.9 MWh size. These provide power for grid stability, as well as energy shifting. On a sunny day the diesel generators are switched off from 9 a.m. to 8 pm. This is made possible by grid-forming inverters produced by SMA. This is one of the first such solar parks in the world, and provides 40% to 50% of the island's electricity.

Education
Dutch government policy towards St. Eustatius and other SSS islands promoted English medium education. Sint Eustatius has bilingual English-Dutch education.

Gwendoline van Putten School (GVP) is a secondary school on the island.

Other schools include: Golden Rock School, Gov. de Graaff School, Methodist School, SDA School.

Sports
The most popular sports on Sint Eustatius are football, futsal, softball, basketball, swimming and volleyball. Due to the small population, there are few sport associations. One of them, the Sint Eustatius Volleyball Association, is a member of ECVA and NORCECA. Currently St. Eustatius is a non-active member of the Caribbean zone of Pony Baseball and Softball leagues.

Famous Statians
 Antony Beaujon ( 1763–1805), colonial governor
 Gerald Berkel (b. 1969), politician
 Black Harry (18th century), methodist preacher 
 Kizzy (b. 1979), artist
 Lolita Euson (1914–1994), writer and poet 
 Ziggi Recado (b. 1981), artist
 Shirma Rouse, singer

See also

 Caribbean Netherlands
 Dissolution of the Netherlands Antilles
 Governors of Sint Eustatius, Saba and Sint Maarten
 F. D. Roosevelt Airport
 Great Hurricane of 1780
 Index of Netherlands Antilles-related articles
 Plantations of Sint Eustatius

Notes

References

Bibliography
 
 Mordechai Arbell, The Jewish Nation of the Caribbean, The Spanish-Portuguese Jewish Settlements in the Caribbean and the Guianas (2002) Geffen Press, Jerusalem
 Harry Ezratty, 500 Years in the Jewish Caribbean – The Spanish and Portuguese Jews in the West Indies (1997) Omni Arts, Baltimore
 David Spinney, Rodney, (1969)  Allen & Unwin
 P Bernardini (Editor), N Fiering (Editor) The Jews and the Expansion of Europe to the West, 1450–1800 (2001), Berghan Press
 J. Hartog, History of St. Eustatius (1976) Central U.S.A. Bicentennial Committee of the Netherlands Antilles
 Y. Attema, A Short History of St. Eustatius and its Monuments (1976) Wahlberg Press
 Ronald Hearst, The Golden Rock, (1996), Naval Institute Press
 Andrew Jackson O'Shaunhassey, The Men Who Lost America, (2013), Yale Press
 Babara W. Tuchman, The First Salute, (1988), Alfred A. Knopf; Book Club Edition

External links

 St. Eustatius Government
 St. Eustatius Tourist Office's homepage
 The website of STENAPA, the National Parks of St. Eustatius
 St. Eustatius info in Lonely Planet website
 St. Eustatius Center for Archaeological Research
 The Farm in St. Eustatius: Not Dead Yet
 Colorful stories from St. Eustatius' eventful history. Saba invasion
 Colorful stories from St. Eustatius' eventful history. Bermuda connection
 "Retribution: Admiral Rodney and the Jews of St. Eustatius", by Louis Arthur Norton

 
Islands of the Netherlands Antilles
Leeward Islands (Caribbean)
Caribbean special municipalities of the Netherlands
Dutch-speaking countries and territories
English-speaking countries and territories